County Road 12 or County Route 12 may refer to:

 County Road 12 (Prince Edward County, Ontario)
 County Road 12 (Gadsden County, Florida)
 County Road 12 (Leon County, Florida)
 County Road 12 (Liberty County, Florida)
 County Road 12 (Cook County, Minnesota)
 County Road 12 (Goodhue County, Minnesota)
 County Road 12 (Hennepin County, Minnesota)
 County Road 12 (Washington County, Minnesota)
 County Route 12 (Monmouth County, New Jersey)
 County Route 12 (Allegany County, New York)
 County Route 12 (Cattaraugus County, New York)
 County Route 12 (Chemung County, New York)
 County Route 12 (Chenango County, New York)
 County Route 12 (Clinton County, New York)
 County Route 12 (Genesee County, New York)
 County Route 12 (Greene County, New York)
 County Route 12 (Jefferson County, New York)
 County Route 12 (Nassau County, New York)
 County Route 12 (Niagara County, New York)
 County Route 12 (Onondaga County, New York)
 County Route 12 (Otsego County, New York)
 County Route 12 (Putnam County, New York)
 County Route 12 (Schuyler County, New York)
 County Route 12 (St. Lawrence County, New York)
 County Route 12 (Steuben County, New York)
 County Route 12 (Suffolk County, New York)
 County Route 12 (Ulster County, New York)
 County Route 12 (Warren County, New York)